During the 1946–47 season Walsall competed in the Football League Third Division South where they finished in 5th position with 46 points.

Final league table

Third Division South

Results

Legend

Football League Third Division South

FA Cup

References
 1946–47 Walsall season at Statto.com
 1946–47 Walsall season at Soccerway.com (use drop down list to select relevant season)

External links

Walsall F.C. seasons
Walsall